Brickellia veronicifolia is a North American species of plants in the family Asteraceae. It is widespread across much of Mexico, from Chihuahua to Oaxaca. In the United States, it very rare, found only in the Chisos Mountains inside Big Bend National Park in Texas, and also in Otero County in New Mexico.

Brickellia veronicifolia is a shrub up to 90 cm (3 feet) tall. It produces large numbers of small, pale yellow or cream-colored flower heads.

Brickellia veronicifolia contains high amounts of essential oils, Germacrene D, a natural insecticide and the two flavonoids brickellin and eupatolitin.

References

External links

veronicifolia
Flora of Mexico
Plant toxin insecticides
Plants described in 1818
Flora of the South-Central United States
Flora without expected TNC conservation status